Bank of Commerce, commonly known as BankCom, is a universal bank in the Philippines and is licensed by the Bangko Sentral ng Pilipinas (BSP). BankCom is the banking arm of diversified conglomerate San Miguel Corporation (SMC). It has a total network of 140 Branches and 260 Automated Teller Machines (ATMs) located nationwide, as of December 31, 2020. As of 2022, BankCom is the fifteenth largest bank in the Philippines in terms of assets.

History
BankCom has been operating since 1963 and traces its origins to Overseas Bank of Manila with headquarters in Binondo, Manila. The bank has since evolved through different phases of growth. In 1980, Overseas Bank of Manila changed its name to Commercial Bank of Manila (ComBank). The following year, the Government Service Insurance System (GSIS) acquired ComBank. In 1984, ComBank acquired Royal Savings Bank. 

Bank of Boston, one of the oldest and leading banks in the United States together with a local investment group acquired ComBank in 1988. The bank was then renamed Boston Bank of the Philippines.

In November 1991, the bank changed its official name to Bank of Commerce. With the buyout of Bank of Boston's majority interest in 1993, Bank of Commerce was placed under complete Filipino ownership. As part of its growth plans, Bank of Commerce acquired Pan Asia Bank and purchased selected assets and liabilities of Trader’s Royal Bank in 2001. These takeovers significantly increased the Bank’s presence in the banking industry.

In 2008, San Miguel Properties, Inc., a subsidiary of San Miguel Corporation (SMC), and San Miguel Corporation Retirement Fund, the registered retirement plan of SMC Group employees, became the controlling shareholders of Bank of Commerce. San Miguel Properties, Inc. has 39.89% of ownership and San Miguel Corporation Retirement Fund has 39.94% of ownership, as of December 31, 2019.

On January 16, 2013, the Securities and Exchange Commission (SEC) approved the extension of the corporate life of Bank of Commerce for another 50 years from December 16, 2013.

Lehman Brothers' exposure

On September 17, 2008, Bangko Sentral ng Pilipinas announced that 7 Philippine banks have $386M in exposure to Lehman Brothers. Bank of Commerce was one of those affected having $15 million in exposure to the bankrupt US investment banking giant but the bank’s exposure was fully provided for as with the other affected banks.

References

External links

 Bank of Commerce Official Website
 Bangko Sentral ng Pilipinas

Banks of the Philippines
Companies based in Mandaluyong
San Miguel Corporation subsidiaries